The New York Central Railroad's Niagara was a  "Northern" type steam locomotive named after the Niagara River and Falls. It had a  wheel arrangement and is considered as one of the most efficient 4-8-4 locomotives ever built.

The first New York Central Railroad Northern  was ordered in 1931: No. 800, an experimental locomotive that had its boiler divided into three sections of different pressure. This was another failed experiment in high pressure steam locomotives.

By the 1940s, loads being hauled on the New York Central main line from New York to Chicago were as much as the famous J-class NYC Hudson 's could handle. The Chief of Motive Power for the railroad, Paul W. Kiefer, decided to order some 's which could sustain  on the run between the two cities, day after day without respite.

The American Locomotive Company (ALCO) proposed these locomotives, and although the design owes something to the Union Pacific 4-8-4's, of which Union Pacific 844 is the best-known, the design was actually quite new. Some steam experts have claimed the Niagara to be the ultimate locomotive, as it had the speed of an FEF (the Union Pacific's nickname for their 'four eight fours' was FEF) and the power of Northerns with smaller driver wheels.

Locomotive details
The first Niagara was Class S-1a No. 6000, delivered in March, 1945; the S-1b's (6001-6025) were delivered in 1945 and 1946. The NYC's last Niagara steam locomotive was Class S-2 No. 5500 "Super Niagara", also delivered in 1946; uniquely among Niagaras, it had Franklin-Caprotti poppet valves. The Niagaras did not have steam domes, as did most steam locomotives, which resulted in a smooth contour along the top of the boiler. A perforated pipe collected steam instead. This was necessary because of the lower loading gauge (height clearance restrictions) of the New York Central (15 ft 2 in versus  for other American railroads), particularly east of Buffalo.

These locomotives had a small water capacity (18,000 US gallons; 68,000 litres) in the tender, because the New York Central was one of the few railroads in North America which used track pans. This allowed a larger coal capacity—46 tons—so the Harmon, New York to Chicago run (928.1 miles) could be done with one stop for coal. The stop was at Wayneport, New York: 14 miles east of Rochester, which left 602.2 miles to Chicago via the Cleveland lakefront. This worked with the 46-ton coal capacity of the PT tenders, though coal was fairly low in the tenders by the time La Salle Station was reached, with an approximate mileage of 15 miles per ton of coal for such a high-horsepower steam locomotive.

On test these locomotives reached  in the cylinders, and ran 26,000 miles per month.

Cylinders:
Bore and stroke: 25½×32 inches (648×813 mm)
Driving wheel diameter: 
Boiler pressure: 275 lbf/in² (1.90 MPa)
Tractive effort: 61,570 pounds-force (273.9 kN)
Axle load: 32 long tons (32.5 t)
Valve gear: Baker valve gear
Total length: 
Total weight: 405 long tons (411 t)

All bearings were either roller bearings or needle rollers.

Maintenance 

The six days per week running schedule of these locomotives meant that all of the maintenance work normally done over the course of that week would have to be done on one day. This meant a specialized system was developed, where men in "hot suits" (asbestos heat-resistant coveralls) entered the firebox while the locomotive was still in steam and cleared all of the tubes, repaired the brick arch, etc. As the temperature inside the firebox itself would have been well over 212 degrees Fahrenheit (100 C), and the working area these maintenance workers would have been standing on was the still-hot firebars of the grate, all references describe these workers as 'heroic'.

This type of intensive maintenance was studied by steam locomotive designers such as Andre Chapelon, Livio Dante Porta and David Wardale. These designers based their modern steam locomotives on the experience gained with these Niagara-class locomotives: reliability and a close attention to details, leading to a reduction in maintenance costs.

The 1946 steam-versus-diesel trials 
Six of these locomotives were chosen by their designer, Paul W. Kiefer, for the famous 1946 Steam Versus Diesel road trials, where the  Niagaras were put up against some  diesels (E7's). The results were close:

(Note that Kiefer only claimed 5050 drawbar horsepower from a 79-inch , and the last line (dollars/power) has been added)

The results were much closer than the diesel salesmen were comfortable with, but these steam locomotives were hampered by several factors: a series of coal miners' strikes; aggressive dieselization sales efforts; and a failure of the highly-expensive firebox-wrapper metallurgy to withstand the conditions of actual operation.

Planned Duplex Drive Variant
A  duplex drive steam locomotive based on the Niagara was planned as a true competitor to the Pennsylvania Railroad’s T1, called the C-1a, which was never built.

Disposition

The entire series was retired and scrapped between late 1955 and July, 1956, with #6015 the last engine to go. (S2a #5500 was retired earlier, in 1951, and served as a spare-parts supply for her sisters until 1956). The reason that none of the NYC Niagara locomotives survive in preservation today is due to the total pro-scrapping mentality of then-NYC President Alfred E. Perlman, who similarly ordered that every NYC Hudson be scrapped. (Two New York Central 4-8-2 Mohawks, L2d #2933 and L3a #3001, managed to survive by lucky flukes.) As the NYC gained less than $15,000 in scrap value from Luria Brothers for each Niagara, which cost about $248,000 each in 1945, this "leadership" was and is an enormous historic-preservation tragedy and outrage.

Replicas 
 Completed in 1998 after 25 years construction, an accurate live steam replica 1/5 scale  gauge model of 6019 is the largest known example of this extinct class in the world and works alongside a 1/5 scale NKP Berkshire at the private Stapleford Miniature Railway in the UK.

See also 
 PRR T1

References

Further reading 

https://nycshs.files.wordpress.com/2015/01/the-niagara-story.pdf
Know Thy Niagaras (The Definitive Sourcebook On This Locomotive Class)

New York Central Railroad locomotives
4-8-4 locomotives
ALCO locomotives
Steam locomotives of the United States
Railway locomotives introduced in 1945
Scrapped locomotives